David Nigel Sims (9 August 1931 – 6 January 2018), known as Nigel Sims, was an English footballer who played as a goalkeeper in the Football League for Wolverhampton Wanderers, Aston Villa and Peterborough United in the 1950s and 1960s.

Sims was born at Coton in the Elms, Derbyshire. He joined Wolverhampton Wanderers from Stapenhill in August 1948 as understudy to Bert Williams, and made his first-team debut on 18 April 1949 in a 1–1 draw with Sheffield United in the First Division. While a National Serviceman in 1950, Sims played for the Army in a representative match against an Irish Football Association XI. During his eight seasons at Wolves he only made 39 appearances before transferring to Midlands rivals Aston Villa in March 1956. He made his debut against Burnley that same month.

He was on the winning side in the 1957 FA Cup Final, in which Villa beat Manchester United 2–1, followed three years later by a Second Division winners' medal. In 1961, he helped Villa lift the inaugural League Cup.

He played representative matches for the Football League, and in 1958, was the first winner of Aston Villa supporters' "Terrace Trophy".

In September 1964, having lost his place in the side, he transferred to Peterborough United. He appeared only 16 times for them before trying his luck in Canada, having already spent a summer with Toronto City in the Eastern Canada Professional Soccer League. He appeared twice for the Toronto Falcons in the National Professional Soccer League, and also played for Toronto Italia.

In Safe Hands, a book about his footballing memories, was published in August 2012.

References

External links
 NPSL stats and photo at NASL Jerseys
 

1931 births
2018 deaths
People from South Derbyshire District
Footballers from Derbyshire
English footballers
Association football goalkeepers
Wolverhampton Wanderers F.C. players
Aston Villa F.C. players
Toronto City players
Peterborough United F.C. players
Toronto Falcons (1967–68) players
Toronto Italia players
English Football League players
National Professional Soccer League (1967) players
English expatriate footballers
English expatriate sportspeople in Canada
Expatriate soccer players in Canada
English Football League representative players
Canadian National Soccer League players
Eastern Canada Professional Soccer League players
FA Cup Final players